Roger William Heyns (January 27, 1918, Grand Rapids, Michigan – September 11, 1995, Volos, Greece) was an American professor and academic who served as the fourth chancellor of the University of California, Berkeley from 1965 to 1971.

Education 

He received his A.B. degree from Calvin College in 1940 and his M.A. and Ph.D. in psychology from the University of Michigan.

Career 

Heyns spent the first part of his career as a professor of psychology at the University of Michigan, where he had obtained his graduate degrees.  He started teaching there in 1947, two years before receiving his doctorate, and in 1957 was promoted to dean of UMich's College of Literature, Science, and the Arts.  In 1961, he was again promoted to vice president of academic affairs. 

Heyns served as UC Berkeley's chancellor from 1965 to 1971. UC President Clark Kerr later wrote that of all the chancellors he personally worked with, Heyns had the most tormenting assignment of all.

In 1968, Heyns became involved in the turmoil of Berkeley's Free Speech Movement. After retiring from the chancellorship, Heyns went on to serve as president of the William and Flora Hewlett Foundation and also co-founded the Public Policy Institute of California.

References

External links
 
 

1918 births
1995 deaths
Leaders of the University of California, Berkeley
University of Michigan College of Literature, Science, and the Arts alumni
20th-century American academics